Hjem til jul may refer to:

Hjem til jul (2010 film), a Norwegian film
Hjem til jul (TV series), a 2019 Norwegian TV series